Pathak is a surname native to India. Pathak is mainly used by Hindu  Brahmin communities of North India and Western India.

Notable people with the surname Pathak include:
 

 Amit Pathak (born 1972), former first-class cricketer
 Amita Pathak, Indian actress
 Arun Pathak (born 1975), Indian politician and social activist
 Arun Pathak (Bihar politician) advisor to the Governor of Bihar
 Arun Pathak (Uttar Pradesh politician) (born 1973), Indian politician, social activist and teacher
 Brajesh Pathak (born 1964), Indian politician
 Bindeshwar Pathak (born 1943), Indian sociologist
 Chirag Pathak (born 1987) first-class cricketer
 Dina Pathak (1922–2002), Indian actor and director
 Falguni Pathak (born 1964), Indian singer
 Gangadhar Pathak (1923–?), Indian writer, poet and historian
 Gopal Swarup Pathak (1896–1982), Vice President of India (1969–1974)
 Harin Pathak (born 1947), Indian politician
 Heera Pathak (1916–1995), Indian poet, literary critic, and wife of Ramnarayan
 Krishan Pathak (born 1997), field hockey goalkeeper for the Indian national side
 Mohit Pathak, music director, singer and lyricist 
 N. R. Pathak (1915–1985), Indian humanitarian, social worker, and politician
 Parag Pathak (born 1980), Nepalese-American academic
 Pashchim Pathak (born 1976), Indian Cricket umpire
 Prashant Pathak, Indo-Canadian investor, businessman and philanthropist
 Punit Pathak (born 1986), dancer, choreographer and actor 
 Raghunandan Swarup Pathak (1924–2007), Chief Justice of India
 Ramnarayan V. Pathak (1887–1955), Indian poet, short story writer, and literary critic
 Rameshwar Pathak (1938-2010), Indian singer
 Ratna Pathak (born 1963), Indian actress
 Riti Pathak (born 1977) is a member of the Lower House of Parliament in India from Sidhi in Madhya Pradesh who belongs to Bharatiya Janata Party
 Ritu Pathak (born 1987), Bollywood playback singer
 Sabitri Bogati (Pathak), Nepalese politician
 Sandeep Pathak, Indian politician and Rajya Sabha member
 Sandeep Pathak, cinema and theatre actor
 Sanjay Pathak (born 1970), Indian former politician
 Shanta Pathak (1927–2010), British businesswoman
 Shivam Pathak, singer-songwriter
 Shruti Pathak, playback singer
 Shyam Pathak, Indian actor
 Subrat Pathak (born 1979), Bharatiya Janata Party politician, elected to the Lok Sabha in the 2019 Indian general election .
 Supriya Pathak (born 1961), Indian actress
 Surender Mohan Pathak (born 1940), Indian author
 V. S. Pathak  (1926–2003), Indian historian and writer
 Vandana Pathak, film, stage and TV actress
 Vijay Bahadur Pathak, Indian politician
 Vinay Kumar Pathak, Vice Chancellor of Dr A.P.J.Abdul Kalam University, Lucknow
 Vinay Pathak (born 1968), Indian actor

References

Indian surnames
Nepali-language surnames